Threemile Creek is a stream in northern Crawford and Franklin counties in the U.S. state of Missouri. It is a tributary to the Little Bourbeuse River.

The southeastern corner of Gasconade County is within the stream floodplain about 50 feet from the stream channel. The elevation at the stream confluence is 732 feet and the elevation of the source is at about 980 feet.

Threemile Creek most likely was descriptively named on account of an estimate of its length.

See also
List of rivers of Missouri

References

Rivers of Crawford County, Missouri
Rivers of Franklin County, Missouri
Rivers of Gasconade County, Missouri
Rivers of Missouri